The 1913 North Carolina Tar Heels football team represented the University of North Carolina in the 1913 college football season. The team captain of the 1913 season was L. L. Albernethy.

Schedule

References

North Carolina
North Carolina Tar Heels football seasons
North Carolina Tar Heels football